David Paul (March 8, 1957 – March 6, 2020) was an American actor. He and his twin brother Peter were born in Hartford, Connecticut. The death of David was confirmed by his twin brother Peter. David died just two days before his 63rd birthday.

Acting credits 

Paul and his twin brother Peter Paul were together known as "The Barbarian Brothers".

They appeared in an episode of Knight Rider entitled "Knight of the Drones".

David and Peter had a small part in the Oliver Stone movie Natural Born Killers in which they are in a bodybuilding public gym milieu being interviewed by Robert Downey Jr.'s character, but the scene ended up on the cutting room floor. Their part can be found on the director's cut of the film, in which director Stone says of the excised Barbarian Brothers scene "they're overacting, and it's my fault."

Filmography

References 

Male actors from Hartford, Connecticut
American television hosts
American television producers
American bodybuilders
Identical twin male actors
1957 births
2020 deaths